Xenorma cytheris is a moth of the family Notodontidae first described by Herbert Druce in 1891. It is found in Central America, and Mexico.

References

Moths described in 1891
Notodontidae